

Events

Pre-1600
411 BC – The Athenian coup succeeds, forming a short-lived oligarchy.
53 – The Roman emperor Nero marries Claudia Octavia.
68 – Nero dies by suicide after quoting Vergil's Aeneid, thus ending the Julio-Claudian dynasty and starting the civil war known as the Year of the Four Emperors.
 721 – Odo of Aquitaine defeats the Moors in the Battle of Toulouse.
747 – Abbasid Revolution: Abu Muslim Khorasani begins an open revolt against Umayyad rule, which is carried out under the sign of the Black Standard.
1311 – Duccio's Maestà, a seminal artwork of the early Italian Renaissance, is unveiled and installed in Siena Cathedral in Siena, Italy.
1523 – The Parisian Faculty of Theology fines Simon de Colines for publishing the Biblical commentary Commentarii initiatorii in quatuor Evangelia by Jacques Lefèvre d'Étaples.
1534 – Jacques Cartier is the first European to describe and map the Saint Lawrence River.

1601–1900
1667 – Second Anglo-Dutch War: The Raid on the Medway by the Dutch fleet begins. It lasts for five days and results in the worst ever defeat of the Royal Navy. 
1732 – James Oglethorpe is granted a royal charter for the colony of the future U.S. state of Georgia.
1772 – The British schooner Gaspee is burned in Narragansett Bay, Rhode Island.
1798 – Irish Rebellion of 1798: Battles of Arklow and Saintfield.
1815 – End of the Congress of Vienna: The new European political situation is set. 
1856 – Five hundred Mormons leave Iowa City, Iowa for the Mormon Trail.
1862 – American Civil War: Stonewall Jackson concludes his successful Shenandoah Valley Campaign with a victory in the Battle of Port Republic; his tactics during the campaign are now studied by militaries around the world.
1863 – American Civil War: The Battle of Brandy Station in Virginia, the largest cavalry battle on American soil, ends Confederate cavalry dominance in the eastern theater.
1885 – Treaty of Tientsin is signed to end the Sino-French War, with China eventually giving up Tonkin and Annam – most of present-day Vietnam – to France.
1900 – Indian nationalist Birsa Munda dies of cholera in a British prison.

1901–present
1922 – Åland's Regional Assembly convened for its first plenary session in Mariehamn, Åland; today, the day is celebrated as Self-Government Day of Åland.
1923 – Bulgaria's military takes over the government in a coup.
1928 – Charles Kingsford Smith completes the first trans-Pacific flight in a Fokker Trimotor monoplane, the Southern Cross.
1930 – A Chicago Tribune reporter, Jake Lingle, is killed during rush hour at the Illinois Central train station by Leo Vincent Brothers, allegedly over a $100,000 gambling debt owed to Al Capone.
1944 – World War II: Ninety-nine civilians are hanged from lampposts and balconies by German troops in Tulle, France, in reprisal for maquisards attacks.
  1944   – World War II: The Soviet Union invades East Karelia and the previously Finnish part of Karelia, occupied by Finland since 1941.
1948 – Foundation of the International Council on Archives under the auspices of the UNESCO.
1953 – The Flint–Worcester tornado outbreak sequence kills 94 people in Massachusetts.
1954 – Joseph N. Welch, special counsel for the United States Army, lashes out at Senator Joseph McCarthy during the Army–McCarthy hearings, giving McCarthy the famous rebuke, "You've done enough. Have you no sense of decency, sir, at long last? Have you left no sense of decency?"
1957 – First ascent of Broad Peak by Fritz Wintersteller, Marcus Schmuck, Kurt Diemberger, and Hermann Buhl.
1959 – The  is launched. It is the first nuclear-powered ballistic missile submarine.
1965 – The civilian Prime Minister of South Vietnam, Phan Huy Quát, resigns after being unable to work with a junta led by Nguyễn Cao Kỳ.
  1965   – Vietnam War: The Viet Cong commences combat with the Army of the Republic of Vietnam in the Battle of Đồng Xoài, one of the largest battles in the war.
1967 – Six-Day War: Israel captures the Golan Heights from Syria.
1968 – U.S. President Lyndon B. Johnson declares a national day of mourning following the assassination of Senator Robert F. Kennedy.
1972 – Severe rainfall causes a dam in the Black Hills of South Dakota to burst, creating a flood that kills 238 people and causes $160 million in damage.
1973 – In horse racing, Secretariat wins the U.S. Triple Crown.
1978 – The Church of Jesus Christ of Latter-day Saints opens its priesthood to "all worthy men", ending a 148-year-old policy of excluding black men.
1979 – The Ghost Train fire at Luna Park Sydney, Australia, kills seven.
1995 – Ansett New Zealand Flight 703 crashes into the Tararua Range during approach to Palmerston North Airport on the North Island of New Zealand, killing four.
1999 – Kosovo War: The Federal Republic of Yugoslavia and NATO sign a peace treaty.
2008 – Two bombs explode at a train station near Algiers, Algeria, killing at least 13 people. 
2009 – An explosion kills 17 people and injures at least 46 at a hotel in Peshawar, Pakistan.
2010 – At least 40 people are killed and more than 70 wounded in a suicide bombing at a wedding party in Arghandab, Kandahar.

Births

Pre-1600
1016 – Deokjong of Goryeo, ruler of Korea (d. 1034)
1424 – Blanche II of Navarre (d. 1464)
1580 – Daniel Heinsius, Belgian poet and scholar (d. 1655)
1588 – Johann Andreas Herbst, German composer and theorist (d. 1666)
1595 – Władysław IV Vasa, Polish king (d. 1648)
1597 – Pieter Jansz. Saenredam, Dutch painter (d. 1665)

1601–1900
1640 – Leopold I, Holy Roman Emperor (d. 1705)
1661 – Feodor III of Russia (d. 1682)
1672 – Peter the Great, Russian emperor (d. 1725)
1686 – Andrey Osterman, German-Russian politician, Russian Minister of Foreign Affairs (d. 1747)
1696 – Shiva Rajaram, infant Chattrapati of the Maratha Empire (d. 1726)
1732 – Giuseppe Demachi, Italian violinist and composer (d. 1791)
1754 – Francis Mackenzie, 1st Baron Seaforth, English general and politician, Governor of Barbados (d. 1815)
1768 – Samuel Slater, English-American engineer and businessman (d. 1835)
1781 – George Stephenson, English engineer, designed the Liverpool and Manchester Railway (d. 1848)
1810 – Otto Nicolai, German composer and conductor (d. 1849)
1812 – Johann Gottfried Galle, German astronomer and academic (d. 1910)
1836 – Elizabeth Garrett Anderson, English physician and politician (d. 1917)
1837 – Anne Isabella Thackeray Ritchie, English author (d. 1919)
1842 – Hazard Stevens, American military officer, mountaineer, politician and writer (d. 1918)
1843 – Bertha von Suttner, Austrian journalist and author, Nobel Prize laureate (d. 1914)
  1845   – Frank Norton, American baseball player (d. 1920)
1849 – Michael Ancher, Danish painter and academic (d. 1927)
1851 – Charles Joseph Bonaparte, American lawyer and politician, 46th United States Attorney General (d. 1921)
1861 – Pierre Duhem, French physicist, mathematician, and historian (d. 1916)
  1861   – Gustav Heinrich Johann Apollon Tammann, Russian-German chemist and physicist (d. 1938)
1864 – Jeanne Bérangère, French actress (d. 1928) 
1865 – Albéric Magnard, French composer and educator (d. 1914)
  1865   – Carl Nielsen, Danish violinist, composer, and conductor (d. 1931)
1868 – Jane Avril, French model and dancer (d. 1943)
1874 – Launceston Elliot, Scottish weightlifter and wrestler (d. 1930)
1875 – Henry Hallett Dale, English pharmacologist and physiologist, Nobel Prize laureate (d. 1968)
1879 – Harry DeBaecke, American rower (d. 1961)
1882 – Robert Kerr, Irish-Canadian sprinter and coach (d. 1963)
1885 – Felicjan Sławoj Składkowski, Polish general and politician, 27th Prime Minister of Poland (d. 1962)
1890 – Leslie Banks, English actor, director, and producer (d. 1952)
1891 – Cole Porter, American composer and songwriter (d. 1964)
1893 – Irish Meusel, American baseball player and coach (d. 1963)
1895 – Archie Weston, American football player and journalist (d. 1981)
1898 – Luigi Fagioli, Italian race car driver (d. 1952)
1900 – Fred Waring, American singer, bandleader, and television host (d. 1984)

1901–present
1902 – Skip James, American singer-songwriter and guitarist (d. 1969)
1903 – Felice Bonetto, Italian race car driver (d. 1953)
  1903   – Marcia Davenport, American author and critic (d. 1996)
1906 – Robert Klark Graham, American eugenicist and businessman, founded Repository for Germinal Choice (d. 1997)
1908 – Luis Kutner, American lawyer, author, and activist (d. 1993)
  1908   – Branch McCracken, American basketball player and coach (d. 1970)
1910 – Robert Cummings, American actor, singer, and director (d. 1990)
  1910   – Ted Hicks, Australian public servant and diplomat, Australian High Commissioner to New Zealand (d. 1984)
1912 – Ingolf Dahl, German-American pianist, composer, and conductor (d. 1970)
1915 – Jim McDonald, American football player and coach (d. 1997)
  1915   – Les Paul, American guitarist and songwriter (d. 2009)
1916 – Jurij Brězan, German soldier and author (d. 2006)
  1916   – Siegfried Graetschus, German SS officer (d. 1943)
  1916   – Robert McNamara, American businessman and politician, 8th United States Secretary of Defense (d. 2009)
1917 – Eric Hobsbawm, Egyptian-English historian and author (d. 2012)
1918 – John Hospers, American philosopher and politician (d. 2011)
1921 – Arthur Hertzberg, American rabbi and scholar (d. 2006)
  1921   – Jean Lacouture, French journalist, historian, and author (d. 2015)
1922 – George Axelrod, American director, producer, and screenwriter (d. 2003)
  1922   – Hein Eersel, Surinamese linguist and Minister of Education (d. 2022)
  1922   – John Gillespie Magee Jr., Anglo-American pilot and poet (d. 1941)
  1922   – Fernand Seguin, Canadian biochemist and academic (d. 1988)
1923 – Gerald Götting, German politician (d. 2015)
1924 – Ed Farhat, American wrestler and manager (d. 2003)
1925 – Keith Laumer, American soldier and author (d. 1993)
  1925   – Herman Sarkowsky, German-American businessman and philanthropist, co-founded the Seattle Seahawks (d. 2014)
1926 – Calvin "Fuzz" Jones, American singer and bass player (d. 2010)
  1926   – Happy Rockefeller, American philanthropist, 31st Second Lady of the United States (d. 2015)
1927 – Jim Nolan, American basketball player (d. 1983)
1928 – R. Geraint Gruffydd, Welsh critic and academic (d. 2015)
1929 – Johnny Ace, American singer and pianist (d. 1954)
1930 – Barbara, French singer (d. 1997)
  1930   – Jordi Pujol, Spanish physician and politician, 126th President of the Generalitat de Catalunya
1931 – Jackie Mason, American comedian, actor, and screenwriter (d. 2021)
  1931   – Nandini Satpathy, Indian author and politician, 8th Chief Minister of Odisha (d. 2006)
  1931   – Bill Virdon, American baseball player, coach, and manager
1933 – Al Cantello, American javelin thrower and coach
1934 – Michael Mates, English colonel and politician
  1934   – Jackie Wilson, American singer-songwriter (d. 1984)
1935 – Dutch Savage, American wrestler and promoter (d. 2013)
1936 – Nell Dunn, English playwright, screenwriter and author
  1936   – Mick O'Dwyer, Irish Gaelic footballer and manager
  1936   – George Radda, Hungarian chemist and academic
1937 – Harald Rosenthal, German hydrobiologist and academic
1938 – Jeremy Hardie, English economist and businessman
  1938   – Giles Havergal, Scottish actor, director, and playwright
  1938   – Charles Wuorinen, American composer and educator (d. 2020)
1939 – Ileana Cotrubaș, Romanian soprano and actress
  1939   – Eric Fernie, Scottish historian and academic
  1939   – David Hobbs, English race car driver and sportscaster
  1939   – Dick Vitale, American basketball player, coach, and sportscaster
  1939   – Charles Webb, American author (d. 2020)
1940 – André Vallerand, Canadian businessman and politician
1941 – Jon Lord, English singer-songwriter and keyboard player (d. 2012)
1942 – Anton Burghardt, German footballer and manager
  1942   – Nicholas Lloyd, English journalist
1943 – John Fitzpatrick, English race car driver
  1943   – Charles Saatchi, Iraqi-English businessman, co-founded Saatchi & Saatchi
1944 – Janric Craig, 3rd Viscount Craigavon, English accountant and politician
  1944   – Wally Gabler, American football player and sportscaster
1946 – Deyda Hydara, Gambian journalist and publisher, co-founded The Point (d. 2004)
  1946   – James Kelman, Scottish author and playwright
  1946   – Peter Kilfoyle, English politician
  1946   – Giulio Terzi di Sant'Agata, Italian politician and diplomat, Italian Minister of Foreign Affairs
1947 – Robert Indermaur, Swiss painter
  1947   – Robbie Vincent, UK disc jockey and radio presenter
1948 – Jim Bailey, American football player
  1948   – Gudrun Schyman, Swedish social worker and politician
1949 – Kiran Bedi, Indian police officer and activist
1950 – Trevor Bolder, English bass player, songwriter, and producer (d. 2013)
  1950   – Fred Jackson, American football player and coach
  1950   – Giorgos Kastrinakis, Greek-American basketball player
1951 – Michael Patrick Cronan, American graphic designer and academic (d. 2013)
  1951   – James Newton Howard, American composer, conductor, and producer
  1951   – Dave Parker, American baseball player and coach
  1951   – Brian Taylor, American basketball player
1952 – Uzi Hitman, Israeli singer-songwriter (d. 2004)
  1952   – Billy Knight, American basketball player
1953 – Ken Navarro, Italian-American guitarist and composer
1954 – Pete Byrne, English singer-songwriter
  1954   – Paul Chapman, Welsh guitarist and songwriter (d. 2020)
  1954   – Gregory Maguire, American author
  1954   – Elizabeth May, American-Canadian environmentalist, lawyer, and politician  
  1954   – George Pérez, American author and illustrator (d. 2022)  
1956 – Berit Aunli, Norwegian skier
  1956   – Patricia Cornwell, American journalist and author
  1956   – Marek Gazdzicki, Polish nuclear physicist
  1956   – Joaquín, Spanish footballer
  1956   – John Le Lievre, British squash player (d. 2021)
  1956   – Kayhan Mortezavi, Iranian director
  1956   – Francine Raymond, French Canadian singer-songwriter
  1956   – Nikolai Tsonev, Bulgarian politician
  1956   – Rudolf Wojtowicz, Polish footballer
1957 – Randy Read, English crystallographer and academic
1958 – David Ancrum, American basketball player and coach
1959 – Peter Fowler, Australian golfer
1960 – Steve Paikin, Canadian journalist and author
1961 – Thomas Benson, American football player
  1961   – Michael J. Fox, Canadian-American actor, producer, and author
  1961   – Aaron Sorkin, American screenwriter, producer, and playwright
1962 – Yuval Banay, Israeli singer-songwriter and guitarist 
  1962   – Ken Rose, American football player
  1962   – David Trewhella, Australian rugby league player
1963 – Gilad Atzmon, Israeli-English saxophonist, author, and activist 
  1963   – Johnny Depp, American actor
  1963   – David Koepp, American director, producer, and screenwriter
1964 – Gloria Reuben, Canadian-American actress
  1964   – Wayman Tisdale, American basketball player and bass player (d. 2009)
1967 – Rubén Maza, Venezuelan runner
 1967    – Jian Ghomeshi, Iranian-Canadian radio personality
1968 – Niki Bakoyianni, Greek high jumper and coach
1969 – André Racicot, Canadian ice hockey player
  1969   – Eric Wynalda, American soccer player, coach, and sportscaster 
1971 – Gilles De Bilde, Belgian footballer and sportscaster
  1971   – Jean Galfione, French pole vaulter and sportscaster
  1971   – Jackie McKeown, Scottish singer-songwriter and guitarist 
1972 – Matt Horsley, Australian footballer and coach
1973 – Aigars Apinis, Latvian discus thrower and shot putter
  1973   – Tedy Bruschi, American football player and sportscaster
  1973   – Frédéric Choffat, Swiss director, producer, and cinematographer
  1973   – Grant Marshall, Canadian ice hockey player
1974 – Samoth, Norwegian singer-songwriter and guitarist 
1975 – Otto Addo, German-Ghanaian footballer and manager 
  1975   – Ameesha Patel, Indian actress and model 
  1975   – Andrew Symonds, English-Australian cricketer (d. 2022) 
1977 – Usman Afzaal, Pakistani-English cricketer
  1977   – Paul Hutchison, English cricketer
  1977   – Olin Kreutz, American football player
  1977   – Peja Stojaković, Serbian basketball player
1978 – Matt Bellamy, English singer, musician and songwriter
  1978   – Shandi Finnessey, American model and actress, Miss USA 2004
  1978   – Miroslav Klose, German footballer
  1978   – Heather Mitts, American soccer player
  1978   – Hayden Schlossberg, American director, producer, and screenwriter
1979 – Dario Dainelli, Italian footballer
  1979   – Amanda Lassiter, American basketball player
1980 – D'banj, Nigerian singer-songwriter and harmonica player
  1980   – Mike Fontenot, American baseball player
  1980   – Udonis Haslem, American basketball player
  1980   – Lehlohonolo Seema, South African footballer
1981 – Natalie Portman, Israeli-American actress
  1981   – Parinya Charoenphol, Thai boxer, model, and actress
1982 – Yoshito Ōkubo, Japanese footballer
  1982   – Christina Stürmer, Austrian singer-songwriter
1983 – Firas Al-Khatib, Syrian footballer
  1983   – Josh Cribbs, American football player
  1983   – Dwayne Jones, American basketball player
  1983   – Danny Richar, Dominican-American baseball player
1984 – Yulieski Gourriel, Cuban baseball player
  1984   – Jake Newton, Guyanese footballer
  1984   – Asko Paade, Estonian basketball player
  1984   – Masoud Shojaei, Iranian footballer
  1984   – Wesley Sneijder, Dutch footballer
1985 – Richard Kahui, New Zealand rugby player
  1985   – Sonam Kapoor, Indian model and actress
  1985   – Sebastian Telfair, American basketball player
1986 – Doug Legursky, American football player 
  1986   – Yadier Pedroso, Cuban baseball player (d. 2013) 
  1986   – Ashley Postell, American gymnast
1987 – Jaan Mölder, Estonian race car driver
1988 – Jason Demers, Canadian ice hockey defenseman
  1988   – Sara Isaković, Slovenian swimmer 
  1988   – Mae Whitman, American actress 
1989 – Dídac Vilà, Spanish footballer
1990 – Matthias Mayer, Austrian skier
  1990   – Antonella Alonso, Venezuelan pornographic actress
1991 – Aaron M. Johnson, American jazz saxophonist
  1992   – Zach Hyman, Canadian ice hockey player
1992 – Yannick Agnel, French swimmer
  1992   – Boyd Cordner, Australian rugby league player
1993 – George Jennings, Australian rugby league player

Deaths

Pre-1600
68 – Nero, Roman emperor (b. 37)
 373 – Ephrem the Syrian, hymnographer and theologian (b. 306)
 597 – Columba, Irish missionary and saint (b. 521)
 630 – Shahrbaraz, king of the Persian Empire
 908 – Yang Wo, Prince of Hongnong
1075 – Gebhard of Supplinburg, Saxon count
1087 – Otto I of Olomouc (b. 1045)
1238 – Peter des Roches, bishop of Winchester
1252 – Otto I, Duke of Brunswick-Lüneburg
1348 – Ambrogio Lorenzetti, Sienese painter (b. 1290)
1361 – Philippe de Vitry, French composer and poet (b. 1291)
1563 – William Paget, 1st Baron Paget, English accountant and politician, Chancellor of the Duchy of Lancaster (b. 1506)
1572 – Jeanne d'Albret, Navarrese queen and Huguenot leader (b. 1528)
1583 – Thomas Radclyffe, 3rd Earl of Sussex, English politician, Lord Lieutenant of Ireland (b. 1525)
1597 – José de Anchieta, Spanish Jesuit missionary (b. 1534)

1601–1900
1647 – Leonard Calvert, Colonial governor of Maryland (b. 1606)
1656 – Thomas Tomkins, Welsh-English composer (b. 1572)
1716 – Banda Singh Bahadur, Indian commander (b. 1670)
1717 – Jeanne Guyon, French mystic and author (b. 1648)
1834 – William Carey, English minister and missionary (b. 1761)
1870 – Charles Dickens, English novelist and critic (b. 1812)
1871 – Anna Atkins, English botanist and photographer (b. 1799)
1875 – Gérard Paul Deshayes, French geologist and conchologist (b. 1795)
1889 – Mike Burke, American baseball player (b. 1854)
1892 – William Grant Stairs, Canadian-English captain and explorer (b. 1863)

1901–present
1901 – Adolf Bötticher, German historian and author (b. 1842)
1923 – Princess Helena of the United Kingdom (b. 1846)
1927 – Victoria Woodhull, American activist for women's rights (b. 1838)
1929 – Louis Bennison, American stage and silent film actor (b. 1884)
  1929   – Margaret Lawrence, American stage actress (b. 1889)
1942 – František Erben, Czech gymnast (b. 1874)
1952 – Adolf Busch, German-Austrian violinist and composer (b. 1891)
1953 – Ernest Graves Sr., American football player, coach, and general (b. 1880)
1956 – Chandrashekhar Agashe, Indian industrialist and lawyer (b. 1888)
  1956   – Hans Bergsland, Norwegian fencer (b. 1878)
  1956   – Thomas Hicks, Australian tennis player (b. 1869)
  1956   – Ferdinand Jodl, German general (b. 1896)
1958 – Robert Donat, English actor (b. 1905)
1959 – Adolf Otto Reinhold Windaus, German chemist and academic, Nobel Prize laureate (b. 1876)
1960 – Harry S. Hammond, American football player and businessman (b. 1884)
1961 – Camille Guérin, French veterinarian, bacteriologist and immunologist (b. 1872)
1963 – Jacques Villon, French painter (b.1875)
1964 – Max Aitken, 1st Baron Beaverbrook, British businessman and politician, Chancellor of the Duchy of Lancaster (b. 1879)
1968 – Bernard Cronin, Australian author and journalist (b. 1884)
1972 – Gilberto Parlotti, Italian motorcycle racer (b. 1940)
1973 – Chuck Bennett, American football player and coach (b. 1907)
  1973   – John Creasey, English author and politician (b. 1908)
  1973   – Erich von Manstein, German general (b. 1887)
1974 – Miguel Ángel Asturias, Guatemalan journalist, author, and poet, Nobel Prize laureate (b. 1899)
1979 – Cyclone Taylor, Canadian ice hockey player and civil servant (b. 1884)
1981 – Allen Ludden, American game show host (b. 1917)
1984 – Helen Hardin, American painter (b. 1943)
1989 – George Wells Beadle, American geneticist and academic, Nobel Prize laureate (b. 1903)
1991 – Claudio Arrau, Chilean-American pianist and educator (b. 1903)
1993 – Alexis Smith, Canadian-born American actress (b. 1921)
1994 – Jan Tinbergen, Dutch economist and academic, Nobel Prize laureate (b. 1903)
1997 – Stanley Knowles, American-Canadian academic and politician (b. 1908)
1998 – Lois Mailou Jones, American painter and academic (b. 1905)
2000 – John Abramovic, American basketball player (b. 1919)
  2000   – Jacob Lawrence, American painter and academic (b. 1917)
2004 – Rosey Brown, American football player and coach (b. 1932)
  2004   – Brian Williamson, Jamaican activist, co-founded J-FLAG (b. 1945)
2006 – Drafi Deutscher, German singer-songwriter (b. 1946)
2007 – Frankie Abernathy, American purse designer, cast-member on The Real World: San Diego (b. 1981)
2008 – Algis Budrys, Lithuanian-American author and critic (b. 1931)
  2008   – Suleiman Mousa, Jordanian historian and author (b. 1919)
2009 – Dick May, American race car driver (b. 1930)
2010 – Ken Brown, British Guitarist who was a member of The Quarrymen (b. 1940)
2011 – M. F. Husain, Indian painter and director (b. 1915)
  2011   – Tomoko Kawakami, Japanese voice actress (b. 1970)
  2011   – Mike Mitchell, American basketball player (b. 1956)
2012 – Régis Clère, French cyclist (b. 1956)
  2012   – John Maples, Baron Maples, English lawyer and politician, Shadow Secretary of State for Defence (b. 1943)
  2012   – Ivan Minatti, Slovene poet and translator (b. 1924) 
  2012   – Hawk Taylor, American baseball player and coach (b. 1939)
  2012   – Abram Wilson, American-English trumpet player and educator (b. 1973)
2013 – Iain Banks, Scottish author (b. 1954)
  2013   – Bruno Bartoletti, Italian conductor (b. 1926)
  2013   – John Burke, English rugby player (b. 1948)
  2013   – Walter Jens, German philologist, historian, and academic (b. 1923)
  2013   – Zdeněk Rotrekl, Czech poet and historian (b. 1920)
2014 – Bernard Agré, Ivorian cardinal (b. 1926)
  2014   – Rik Mayall, English comedian, actor, and screenwriter (b. 1958)
  2014   – Elsie Quarterman, American ecologist and academic (b. 1910)
  2014   – Alicemarie Huber Stotler, American lawyer and judge (b. 1942)
  2014   – Gustave Tassell, American fashion designer (b. 1926)
  2014   – Bob Welch, American baseball player and coach (b. 1956)
2015 – Pumpkinhead, American rapper (b. 1975)
  2015   – Pedro Zerolo, Spanish lawyer and politician (b. 1960)
2017 – Adam West, American actor and investor (b. 1928)
2018 – Fadil Vokrri, Kosovo Albanian football administrator and player (b. 1960)
2019 – Bushwick Bill, Jamaican-American rapper (b. 1966)
2022 – Julee Cruise, American singer-songwriter, musician, and actress (b. 1956)
2022 – Matt Zimmerman, Canadian actor (b. 1934)
2022 – Billy Kametz, American voice actor (b. 1987)

Holidays and observances
 Anniversary of the Accession of King Abdullah II (Jordan)
 Autonomy Day (Åland)
 Christian feast day:
 Aidan of Lindisfarne (Evangelical Lutheran Church in America)
 Bede (Evangelical Lutheran Church in America)
 Columba
 Ephrem the Syrian (Roman Catholic Church and Church of England)
 José de Anchieta 
 Primus and Felician
 June 9 (Eastern Orthodox liturgics)
 Coral Triangle Day
 La Rioja Day (La Rioja)
 Murcia Day (Murcia)
 National Heroes' Day (Uganda)

References

External links

 
 
 

Days of the year
June